SALSA (Safe and Local Supplier Approval) is a British food standard.

History
SALSA was set up in 2007 by the British Hospitality Association, British Retail Consortium and Food and Drink Federation.

Structure
The organization regulating SALSA is headquartered in Oxfordshire.

See also
 Assured Food Standards

References

External links
SALSA Food Website
Online Safety Training

2007 establishments in the United Kingdom
Certification marks
Food safety in the United Kingdom
Food safety organizations
Organisations based in Oxfordshire